Naxa textilis is a species of moth which was described by Preyer 1884. Naxa textilis included in the genus Naxa and Geometer moth family. No subspecies are listed in the Catalogue of Life.

Sources 

Geometridae